Hafnium(IV) iodide is the inorganic compound with the formula HfI4.  It is a red-orange, moisture sensitive, sublimable solid that is produced by heating a mixture of hafnium with excess iodine. It is an intermediate in the crystal bar process for producing hafnium metal. 

In this compound, the hafnium centers adopt octahedral coordination geometry. Like most binary metal halides, the compound is a polymeric. It is one-dimensional polymer consisting of chains of edge-shared bioctahedral Hf2I8 subunits, similar to the motif adopted by HfCl4. The nonbridging iodide ligands have shorter bonds to Hf than the bridging iodide ligands.

References

Iodides
Hafnium compounds
Metal halides